Waterton may refer to:

Places
 Waterton Lake, Waterton Lakes National Park, in Alberta, Canada
 Waterton-Glacier International Peace Park in Canada and the USA
Waterton Park, Alberta, also known as Waterton, a town on the Canadian side of the International Peace Park
 Waterton, Lincolnshire, England, a deserted Medieval village
 Waterton Farm, a former seat of the Waterton family (see Armthorpe#Early_history)
 Walton Hall at Waterton Park, a former seat of Charles Waterton and the Waterton family
 Waterton, Aberdeenshire, Scotland
 Waterton, Bridgend, Pen-y-Bont ar Ogwr (Bridgend) in Wales
 Waterton, New Zealand
 Waterton, Luzerne County, Pennsylvania, USA
 Waterton, Gwinnett County, Georgia, USA
 Waterton, a neighbourhood in the eastern part of Whitehouse, Texas, USA
 Waterton, Ontario, Canada (see Leeds and the Thousand Islands, Ontario)
 Waterton, Jefferson County, Colorado, USA
 the lower section of Platte Canyon in Colorado, USA

People
 Charles Waterton, an English naturalist
 Bill Waterton, a Canadian test pilot and aviation correspondent
 Stuart Waterton, a cricketer

See also
Watertown (disambiguation)